Ramzi Aya (born 8 February 1990) is an Italian professional footballer who plays as a defender for  club Avellino. He is of Tunisian descent.

Club career
Born in Rome, capital of Lazio (and Italy), Aya started his career at "Roma Team Sport", a club which signed a partnership agreement with A.S. Roma. In 2005, he was selected to Lazio region U15 representative team, as a midfielder.

Fiorentina (youth)
In 2006, he moved to ACF Fiorentina's Allievi U17 team, rejoining fellow Lazio representatives Federico Masi. Aya was promoted to the reserve in 2007–08 season, which he only entered the play-offs round once in 2008. The team lost to Sampdoria in semi-finals. Fiorentina reserve failed to enter Campionato Nazionale Primavera playoffs in 2009 and 2010.

Since 2008 Aya  also received a shirt number from the first team, No.43 (vacated by Paolo Pincio) and no.41 (vacated by Tagliani) in 2009–10. Aya was eligible to UEFA List B criteria since 2008 (until a possible 2011–12 edition), thus he was included in the List B squad for Viola in 2008–09 and 2009–10 UEFA Champions League.

Aya played twice for the first team in post-season friendly in 2009  and 2010.

Reggiana
In June 2010 Aya left for Reggiana in co-ownership deal along with Samuele Bettoni, for €200,000 and €500 respectively. Co-currently, Marco Romizi and Lorenzo Morelli returned to La Viola for €200,000 and €150,000 respectively. Thus, Fiorentina paid the Emilia minor club €149,500 in net before the end of 2009–10 financial year of Reggiana, as a de facto incentive to act as a farm for Viola. In August 2010 Reggiana signed Piergiuseppe Maritato for €500.

Aya made 23 starts in 2010–11 Lega Pro Prima Divisione. In June 2011 Fiorentina bought back Viola youth product Niccolò Manfredini, (€215,000), Aya (€215,000), Samuele Bettoni (€500) and Maritato (€100,000) from Reggiana, co-currently sold Reggiana youth product Matteo Arati back to Reggio Emilia for €180,500. It made Reggiana received €350,000 in net before the end of 2010–11 season.

On 13 August Maritato was sold to Vicenza in co-ownership deal for a peppercorn fee of €500. Aya followed the footsteps of Maritato to leave Florence on 31 August 2011 also for €500 in co-ownership deal. The club failed to find a buyer for its youth product, which Aya forced to return to Reggiana. Fiorentina failed to sell Bettoni, N.Manfredini, and Edoardo Pazzagli who did not play any game in 2011–12 season.

In the second season with Reggiana, Aya made 30 starts in 2011–12 Lega Pro Prima Divisione.

On 23 June he is purchased entirely by Reggiana.

Fidelis Andria
On 30 August 2015, he joined Andria for free.

Salernitana
On 21 January 2020, he joined Serie B club Salernitana on loan until the end of the 2019–20 season, with Salernitana holding an obligation to purchase his rights at the completion of the loan term.

Reggina
On 24 January 2022, he signed with Reggina.

Avellino
On 6 August 2022, Aya joined Avellino.

International career
Aya was capped twice for Italy national under-20 football team, coached by Francesco Rocca. He played once in 2008–09 season, against Germany in the last match of 2008–09 Four Nations. Aya was not selected to 2009 Mediterranean Games, but selected to de facto U20 B team in annual post-season fixture of U20, unofficial friendlies against Serie D League XI, coached by U19 coach Massimo Piscedda. In June 2011 Aya was recalled by F.Rocca for the last match of 2010–11 Four Nations against Poland.

References

External links
 FIGC 
 Football.it Profile 

1990 births
Italian people of Tunisian descent
Italian sportspeople of African descent
Footballers from Rome
Living people
Italian footballers
Italy youth international footballers
Association football defenders
ACF Fiorentina players
A.C. Reggiana 1919 players
Rimini F.C. 1912 players
S.S. Fidelis Andria 1928 players
Catania S.S.D. players
Pisa S.C. players
U.S. Salernitana 1919 players
Reggina 1914 players
U.S. Avellino 1912 players
Serie A players
Serie B players
Serie C players